The Biological Research Centre (BRC) of the Hungarian Academy of Sciences is located in Szeged, Hungary. The research center was founded in 1971, created by Brunó F. Straub, who was director until 1977. As of 2018, the director is Ferenc Nagy. The four institutes of the BRC employ about 260 scientists, whose work is used in international scientific publications and patents. Research topics include several fields of molecular and cell biology: from the industrial use of bacteria, through controlled improvement of cultivated plants, to human health and environmental protection. The BRC is primarily a scientific research centre; however, scientists at the BRC play a role in the foundation and promotion of biotechnological companies and education. The activities and scientific research pursued at the BRC have been acknowledged by the European Molecular Biology Organization (EMBO); in 2000, the BRC was awarded the title of "Centre of Excellence of the European Union"  by the EU.

Institutes
 Institute of Biophysics
 Institute of Biochemistry
 Institute of Genetics
 Institute of Plant Biology

External links
 BRC homepage

Hungarian culture
Medical and health organisations based in Hungary
Hungarian Academy of Sciences
Organizations established in 1971
1971 establishments in Hungary
Research institutes in Hungary
Research institutes established in 1971